The Pirate Party (PP) is a political party in France based on the model of the Swedish Pirate Party.

The party proposes the reform of the copyright law, free access to scientific knowledge, as well as protection of individual freedom. Like other pirate parties worldwide, it is affiliated to Pirate Parties International (PPI). The youth organisation is called Parti Pirates Jeunes (PPJ; Pirate Party Youth) respectively Les Jeunes du Parti pirate (The Youth of Pirate Party).

History 

The French Pirate party movement was founded on 21 June 2006, relating to the vote of the French Law on Copyright and Related Rights in the Information Society better known as DADVSI. Due to dissension a new section of the Pirate Party emerged in 2007, called Parti pirate français Canal historique (PPFCH). On 4 April 2009, the foundation of the Pirate Party as an organisation was published in the Journal officiel de la République française (page 1663, no. 1795). PP and PPFCH had similar aims and reunited in summer of 2009. Already during the debate on the HADOPI law a further pirate party named Parti pirate français (PPF) appeared, founded by Rémy Cérésiani. The PPF, which had an identical logo combined with a similar name to the PP was finally disbanded in September 2009.

The PP took part in the 10th Yvelines department election on 20 September 2009, and received 472 votes in the first round (turnout: 22.76%), which was 2.08%. There was no record of voting in the second round (turnout: 25.99%), which was won by the conservative UMP candidate.

Legislative election 2012 
The Pirate Party, participated in the 2012 legislative election presenting 101 candidates. Their aim was 50 candidates to receive over 1% to allow them to receive public funding, they only received 24 candidates over 1%. They achieved an average of 0.85% across the districts they stood in. Their best result in metropolitan France was the district of Haut-Rhin with 2.41% but their overall best showing was in the 7th district of oversea French Nationals where they achieved 2.85%.

References

External links 

 Parti pirate at Politiquemania
 
 Parti pirate Jeunes (PPJ), youth organization
 PP-francophone.net (project of the PP)

France
Political parties in France
2006 establishments in France
Political parties established in 2006